Barcelona has a maritime Mediterranean climate Csa according to Köppen-Geiger classification, a warm-temperate subtropical climate (Warmgemäßigt-subtropisches Zonenklima) according to Troll-Paffen climate classification, and a subtropical climate according to Siegmund/Frankenberg climate classification.

Temperature

General 

Large fluctuations in temperature are very rare.

Seasonal climate

Winter 
Winters in Barcelona are mild. The hills around the city  (such as Montjuic) and in the outer metropolitan area, further from the sea, occasionally record frost at night. Frost during the day has been recorded in the city and inner metropolitan area during the strongest cold waves and snowstorms, but is very rare overall. The last time the city recorded a temperature below freezing was on 27 January 2005.

Spring 
Spring lasts usually from March to late May, although in some years it might get into June. Rain is more frequent in spring than in winter and summer, but less than autumn.

Summer 
Generally the summer season lasts from late May or early June to late September or early October. Daytime temperatures above  are rare.

Autumn 
Autumn is the rainiest season of the year, lasting from October to December.

Sunshine 
Sunshine duration is 2,524 hours per year, from 138 - average 4.5 hours of sunshine per day in December to 310 - average 10 hours of sunshine per day in July. This is the middling value for the southern half of Europe because in this part of the continent, sunshine duration varies from about 2,000 to about 3,000 hours per year. However, this is 60% larger value than in northern half of Europe, where sunshine duration is around 1500 hours per year. In winter Barcelona has about three times the sun duration of northern Europe. Barcelona has the UV index close to that of Madrid, differentiating only in the month of March but in the average with the same value being equal to 5, the value varies from 9 (June and July) to 1 (December). Although at about the same latitude New Haven, Connecticut has values a little lower than Barcelona but still close.

Daylight 
Barcelona enjoys one of the most optimal number of hours of winter daylight in Europe. Days in winter are not as short as in the northern part of the continent, the average hours of daylight in December, January and February is 10 hours (for comparison: London or Moscow or Warsaw - about 8 hours).

Precipitation 
Barcelona has on average only 55 precipitation days a year, therein average several rainy days per month (≥ 1 mm), ranging from 2 in July to 6 in October. The average annual precipitation is less than 640 mm (25 inches), ranging from 20 mm (0.79 inch) in July to 91 mm (3.58 inch) in October.

As the city lies on a leeward location relative to the westerlies, the largest amounts of rainfall in the cold season are produced by easternly (backdoor) cold fronts or "Levanters", which can last several days and be enhanced when an Atlantic cutoff travels through the Straits of Gibraltar into the Alboran Sea. So although Atlantic cyclones usually produce little or no precipitation at all, the slipstream effect ("rebuf" in Catalan) behind a cold front or a trough, when N-NW winds from the Ebro valley ("mestral") and the easternmost Pyrenees ("tramuntana") converge around Barcelona, brings rain or, in case of enough low temperatures, snow, as in November 1999. Especially in summer, when sea surface temperature (SST) is higher, convective precipitation can happen in the form of warm rain (i.e. from the coalescence of water droplets without ice formation) instead of a conventional thunderstorm. Either way, these storms can be heavy and lead to flash floods in the lowest parts of the city.

Humidity 
Average relative humidity is 72%, ranging from 69% in July to 75% in October.

Snow 
Snowfalls in the city are rare, but light snowfall events can happen any year on the top of the mountains around the city and in the depths of the metropolitan area (far from the sea) more frequently. A heavy snowfall occurred in Christmas 1962, being the heaviest snowfall recorded in Barcelona since 1887. In the 21st century, the heaviest snowfall happened on 8 March 2010, a thundersnow during which public transport and roads were shut down.

Mean maximums and minimums

Temperature extremes 

Fog 
Barcelona is generally a sunny city, however, some days of fog and spells of overcast days are not rare. Sea fog is frequent in early spring, when the first warm African air masses come in over the cold sea water.

Thunderstorms 
Thunderstorms, which occasionally reach severe limits, are common from mid July until November.

Winds 
Though Barcelona is normally not a windy city, it is affected by sea breezes from May/June to September and winds from the west and northwest in winter. Eastern gales sometimes cause floods on the coastline. East and northeast winds can exceed . In winter Barcelona is sometimes affected by the tramontana or mistral winds, like other places in the Northwestern Mediterranean Basin.

Sea temperature

Seasonal information  
Snow is rare in Barcelona (falling only once every two years on average), although there are resorts for winter sports in the Pyrenees 100–150 km from the city such as La Molina. Summers in  Barcelona area are warm. The summer season ends in October. The weather in Barcelona during spring and autumn can be very changeable. During these months it can rain for quite long periods, but consecutive sunny days are also fairly common. The difference between temperatures during day and night is small because of the strong maritime influence, very rarely surpassing 10 °C.

Climatic data for Barcelona area

See also 
Climate in other places in Iberian Peninsula:
 Climate of Valencia
 Climate of Madrid
 Climate of Bilbao
 Climate of Lisbon
 Climate of Porto
 Climate of Spain
 Climate of Gibraltar

References

External links 
 Sèries climàtiques històriques (1950–2015) - Servei Meteorològic de Catalunya – Generalitat de Catalunya
 Snowfall in Barcelona (1962) on Homage to BCN

Geography of Barcelona
Barcelona
Barcelona